During World War II, a sea defense zone (Seeverteidigung) was a tactical area in the organization of the Kriegsmarine intended to provide operational command of all German naval forces, within a given geographical area, in the event of actual enemy attack on the coastline of occupied Europe.

History

The first sea defense zones were established in the spring of 1940 to protect the large amount of coast line which Germany had acquired after invading the Low Countries, Denmark, Norway, and France. Originally, commanders of the sea defense zones were known as "coastal commanders" (Küstenbefehlshaber).  In the summer of 1940, in preparation for Operation Sea Lion, the Kriegsmarine established seven "sea command sectors" (Seebefehlsstellen) which were commanded by officers ranked Kapitän zur See.  All of the sea command sectors had been disestablished by the end of 1941.

Original Sea Command Sectors (1940)

 Seebefehlsstelle Antwerpen - Antwerp (Sep 1940 - May 1941)
 Seebefehlsstelle Boulogne - Boulogne-sur-Mer (Aug - Oct 1940)
 Seebefehlsstelle Dünkirchen - Dunkirk (Aug - Oct 1940)
 Seebefehlshaber Le Havre - Le Havre (Aug - Oct 1940)
 Seebefehlshaber Rotterdam - Rotterdam (Jun 1940 - Dec 1940)
 Seebefehlshaber Ostende - Ostend (Aug - Oct 1940)
 Seebefehlshaber West - Calais (Aug 1940 - Mar 1941)	

In the spring 1940, the Kriegsmarine began to reorganize coastal defense under a new position known as Kommandant der Seeverteidigung (Sea Defense Zone Commander).  Between 1941 and 1945, the sea defense zones were expanded and retracted, gaining and losing territory to other zones or to the advance of allied or Red Army (Soviet) forces.  Logistically, the sea defense zones were strictly a Navy command, but were integrated into the Atlantic Wall which was generally overseen by the German Army.

Command and control

Sea defense zones were normally commanded by an officer ranked as either Kapitän zur See or Konteradmiral. The sea defense zone commander answered to a Navy regional commander and would take tactical control over all shore forces in a given area should an enemy launch an attack against a segment of German coastline.

The only units permanently assigned to a sea defense zone were naval artillery batteries and anti-aircraft units.  These units also maintained their own administrative chain of command in addition to falling under operational control of a sea defense zone.  During an actual enemy attack, the sea defense commander became the direct superior for all Navy units in the zone's geographical area.  This included all harbor defense units as well as naval infantry regiments.  Typically, the sea defense zone commander would appoint as a deputy the commander of a major German port.  The defense zone commander would himself report to a naval region commander who then acted in the capacity as a ground forces divisional commander.  The ultimate command authority for all sea defense zones were the Navy Group commanders.

List of sea defense zones

References

 Lohmann W. & Hildebrand H., Die Deutsche Kriegsmarine, Verlag Hans-Henning Podzun, Bad Nauheim (1956)

Notes

Kriegsmarine
Military history of Germany during World War II
Fortifications